In the Dark is the second international album release by the reggae singing group Toots and the Maytals, issued in Jamaica and in the United Kingdom on Dragon Records, DRLS 5004, a subsidiary label owned by Chris Blackwell. It was released in September 1974.

Content
To follow up Funky Kingston, label owner Blackwell returned Toots and the Maytals to Dynamic Sound Studios in Kingston for new recordings. Included were songs previously released as singles, "54-46 Was My Number" and "Pomp and Pride." Continuing interesting choices of cover material aimed at the English market, the Maytals included a version of the hit single by John Denver, "Take Me Home, Country Roads," which replaces West Virginia with West Jamaica in the lyric.

For a hybrid release of Funky Kingston for the United States, six songs from this album were substituted for five others from the original Jamaican version of Funky Kingston, adding in the 1969 "Pressure Drop" single. On March 25, 2003, In the Dark was released on compact disc by Universal complete in its original format, along with the Jamaican Funky Kingston album and the "Pressure Drop" single.

Track listing
All tracks written by Frederick "Toots" Hibbert except where noted.

Side one
 "Got to Be There" — 3:06
 "In the Dark" (F. Hibbert, E. Chin) — 2:48
 "Having a Party" — 2:48
 "Time Tough" — 4:23
 "I See You" (B. Davidson) — 3:16
 "Take a Look in the Mirror" — 3:17

Side two
 "Take Me Home, Country Roads" (John Denver, Taffy Nivert, Bill Danoff) — 3:23
 "Fever" — 2:26
 "Love's Gonna Walk Out on me" — 3:15
 "Revolution" — 3:31
 "54-46" — 3:24
 "Sailing On" — 3:35

Personnel
 Frederick "Toots" Hibbert – vocals
 Ralphus "Raleigh" Gordon – vocals
 Nathaniel "Jerry" Matthias – vocals
 Neville Hinds – keyboards
 Hux Brown - Pick Guitar
 Jackie Jackson – bass
 Winston Grennan – drums

References

Toots and the Maytals albums
1973 albums
Mango Records albums